Ruqayyah Ahmed Rufa'i (born c. 1958) was appointed as Nigerian Minister of Education on 6 April 2010, when Acting President Goodluck Jonathan announced his new cabinet.

Early life and education 
Rufa'i was born in Ringim in Jigawa State. She obtained a B.Ed in history at the Bayero University, Kano in 1981, an MA in history from the same university in 1987 and PhD in Education from the West Virginia University, US, in 1991. She was Commissioner for Health under the military regime of General Sani Abacha between 1993 and 1996.

She was promoted professor in 2003, and served as Commissioner for Education, Science and Technology in Jigawa State. She said she was always ashamed when faced with the challenge of low enrollment of the girl-child in Jigawa State, and found it difficult to explain why the state could not enroll more girls in the schools. She banned the use of mobile phones in secondary schools due to their distracting influence.

Leaving ministerial office
Amidst political problem in the ruling party People Democratic Party (PDP) where seven governors, including Sule Lamido of Jigawa State, and dozens of senators and members of House of Representatives split to New PDP, the president Goodluck Ebele Jonathan relieved 9 ministers of their positions. Prof. Ruqayyat was among the affected ministers.

Bibliography

References

Living people
Federal ministers of Nigeria
1950s births
Education ministers of Nigeria
Women government ministers of Nigeria
People from Jigawa State